Kerruish is a Manx surname. Notable people with the surname include:

Charles Kerruish (1917–2003), Speaker of the House of Keys
Mike Kerruish (1948–2010), First Deemster and politician
Sarah Kerruish, documentary director, producer and writer

See also 
Ballafayle (Kerruish) Halt

Surnames of Manx origin